Oxyropsis carinata is a species of armored catfish native to Brazil, Colombia and Peru where it is found in the Amazon basin.  This species grows to a length of  SL.

References
 

Hypoptopomatini
Freshwater fish of Brazil
Freshwater fish of Colombia
Freshwater fish of Peru
Fish of the Amazon basin
Taxa named by Franz Steindachner
Fish described in 1879